Guilin Rail Transit, also known as Guilin Skyrail, is a monorail metro system under development in Guilin, Guangxi, China. Skyrail is the branding of the BYD developed monorail system. There are 7 lines planned by 2040 with 117 stations and a total length of 273.2 kilometres. Line 1 is planned to have been opened by 2025, and it will be 29.23 km with 13 stations.

In 2020, the Exhibition Center demonstration station, featuring a static monorail train, was unveiled. A first  section is under construction between the Exhibition Center station and Shanshui Park, entirely in Lingui District. In January 2021 testing on this first section commenced. Eventually this section will become part of the line between Guilin Liangjiang International Airport and Guilin railway station.

Lines

References 

Rapid transit in China
Monorails
Monorails in China